Eupithecia tenellata is a moth in the family Geometridae. It is found in North Africa (Algeria, Tunisia), Iran and the Arabian Peninsula (Bahrain, Oman).

Subspecies
Eupithecia tenellata tenellata
Eupithecia tenellata perspicuata Schutze, 1961 (Oman)

References

Moths described in 1906
tenellata
Moths of Africa
Moths of Asia